Bannerman's sunbird (Cyanomitra bannermani) is a species of bird in the family Nectariniidae.
It is found in Angola, Democratic Republic of the Congo, and Zambia.

Its scientific and common names honor the ornithologist David Armitage Bannerman.

References

Bannerman's sunbird
Birds of Central Africa
Bannerman's sunbird
Taxonomy articles created by Polbot